Eriobotrya is a genus of flowering plants, mostly large evergreen shrubs and small trees in the family Rosaceae, native to woodland in the Himalayas and East Asia. The loquat, E. japonica, is grown for its edible fruit.

Eriobotrya species are used as food plants by the larvae of some Lepidoptera species including Hypercompe hambletoni.

Species

References

External links
 
 
 Flora of China

 
Rosaceae genera